Spawn: The Eternal is an action-adventure video game developed by Sony Interactive Studios America and published by Sony Computer Entertainment for the PlayStation, based on the comic book character Spawn created by Todd McFarlane and produced by Image Comics. It was released on December 1, 1997 in North America and received poor reviews. When played on a CD player, the disc would be revealed to contain a lengthy audio interview with Spawn creator Todd McFarlane.

Development
Development on the game began in early 1995. The game's original format was scrapped in 1996 so that it could be redesigned in the same 3D maze style as the popular Tomb Raider, leading to the development cycle being stretched out to two years. A release date was announced for August 1997 to be released around the same time the Spawn film was released in theaters, but pushed back to December due to further delays.

All of the character animations were recorded at Sony's in-house motion capture studio in San Diego.

During development the team regularly sent unfinished copies of the game to Todd McFarlane and his right-hand man Terry Fitzgerald, who would review the game and provide feedback.

Reception

The game received an overwhelmingly negative response from critics. GameSpot called it "an adventure game with no story tacked onto a substandard but generic fighting game" citing poor controls, buggy graphics, dull levels, and a camera which moves far too slow to keep up with the player character. IGN complained of grainy textures, simplistic combat, overly easy puzzles, and general lack of challenge. Next Generation likewise said the puzzles are simplistic to the point of being mindless, and found the transition from over-the-shoulder to side-view perspective when entering combat to be confusing. They also criticized the ugly visuals. Shawn Smith of Electronic Gaming Monthly praised the lighting effects, animated textures, and music, but concluded that the gameplay makes Spawn: The Eternal unlikable, and his three co-reviewers were much more negative about the game. Kelly Rickards razed the muddy graphics, awkward fighting engine, and mindless enemy A.I., and Joe Fielder commented, "It fails miserably as both a fighting game and explorative actioneer, with a weak fighting engine, horrible 3-D camera, choppy control and bad graphics. It ranks right down there with Sirtech's Excalibur 2555 and ASC's Perfect Weapon."

GamePro panned the game for the needlessly complex and under-responsive controls, the weak fight music, the repetitive gameplay, and the fact that Spawn only wears his chains and cape during fights. The reviewer gave it 3.5 out of 5 for graphics, 2.5 for control, and 2.0 for both sound and fun factor. Ultra Game Players stated that "Textures are ugly and repetitive, and the resolution is so blocky and pixelated, you'll find yourself longing for the days of eight-bit games."

References

External links
Spawn: The Eternal on IGN
Spawn: The Eternal on GameSpot

1997 video games
Action-adventure games
PlayStation (console) games
PlayStation (console)-only games
Video games about demons
Video games based on Spawn (comics)
Superhero video games
Video games developed in the United States